Ctenomeristis ochrodepta is a species of snout moth in the genus Ctenomeristis. It was described by Edward Meyrick in 1929, and is known from the Marquesas islands and Sumatra (Indonesia). This species has a wingspan of 15–17 mm.

References

Moths described in 1929
Phycitini